Siddiqa Parveen (born 1985) is an Indian woman currently listed by Guinness World Records as the tallest living woman.

Biography 
In December 2012, she was measured lying down by Dr. Debasis Saha and found to be at least , but her fully upright height was estimated to be at least .

See also 
 Dharmendra Pratap Singh - Tallest living man in India
 Vikas Uppal - Tallest ever Indian
 Sultan Kösen - Tallest living man
 Robert Wadlow - Tallest man ever
 Zeng Jinlian - Tallest woman ever

References 

1985 births
Living people
People with gigantism
World record holders